Moira Anderson  (born 5 June 1938) is a Scottish singer.

Life and career
Moira Anderson was born on 5 June 1938 in Kirkintilloch, Dunbartonshire, Scotland. She was educated at Lenzie Academy, She then attended the Royal Scottish Academy of Music and Drama in Glasgow, before getting her big break in the media after a successful audition at the BBC.

She landed her first job in the media, presenting the radio programme Can't Help Singing where she sang with some prestigious names from the world of opera. She went on to make many appearances in the TV series The White Heather Club hosted by Andy Stewart.

She subsequently hosted her own television show, the popular Moira Anderson Sings on BBC1 in 1968. By 1970 she had signed up with the Decca Record Company, performed at the London Palladium and was hosting another show Stars On Sunday which ran for a decade from 1969. She is renowned for her charity work.

In her early career Anderson made frequent appearances alongside fellow Scottish music stars, Kenneth McKellar and other Scottish stars. The pairing was celebrated in the 1971 "Two Ronnies" spoof sketch (Programme 3, 1st Series) featuring "Kenneth Anderson" and "Moira McKellar", in which Ronnie Corbett's Ken described Ronnie Barker's (rather hefty) Moira as "that beautiful lump of Dundee cake". In the early 1980s she made a successful album of duets with Sir Harry Secombe. She recorded "A Perfect Day" by Carrie Jacobs-Bond. Her musical directors over the years have included Peter Knight, Peggy O'Keefe, Nick Ingman and Gordon Cree. She has recorded many albums, including an Ivor Novello collection, conducted by Robin Stapleton, and made many appearances on the BBC TV's popular, long running series, The Good Old Days.

She received an OBE in July 1970. In 2010, she sang two songs at the funeral of Sir Norman Wisdom.

Anderson lives, as of 2016, in retirement on the Isle of Man with her husband of over 50 years, Stuart Macdonald.

References

1938 births
Living people
Officers of the Order of the British Empire
Musicians from Kirkintilloch
Alumni of the Royal Conservatoire of Scotland
Scottish radio presenters
Scottish women radio presenters
Scottish sopranos
Scottish television presenters
Scottish women television presenters
Butlins Redcoats
People educated at Lenzie Academy
People educated at Ayr Academy
20th-century Scottish women singers
Scottish humanitarians